Francis Horace Kendrick (29 March 1914 – 11 August 1995) was an Australian rules footballer who played with South Melbourne in the Victorian Football League (VFL).

Notes

External links 

1914 births
1995 deaths
Australian rules footballers from Victoria (Australia)
Sydney Swans players